What About Me is a 1993 American film drama starring, written, and directed by Rachel Amodeo about a young woman who becomes homeless on the streets of New York City.

Cast
Rachel Amodeo
Richard Edson
Johnny Thunders
Nick Zedd
Gregory Corso
Richard Hell
Dee Dee Ramone
Judy Carne
Rockets Redglare
Jerry Nolan

Reception

Critical reaction
Aaron Hillis, reviewing the film for The Village Voice in 2014, writes "Come for the cult of personality, stay for the nostalgia of a dirtier, dodgier, far cooler scene.".

References

External links
 
 

1993 films
American drama films
Films about homelessness
1993 drama films
1990s American films